Hamato may refer to:
 Hamato Yoshi
 Ibrahim Hamato